Niurka Auristela Acevedo is an actress and a pageant titleholder.

Acevedo was born in Maturín, Venezuela She is the Miss Venezuela International titleholder for 1991, and was the official representative of Venezuela to the Miss International 1991 pageant held in Tokyo, Japan, on October 13, 1991. Acevedo competed in the national beauty pageant Miss Venezuela 1991 and won the title of Miss Venezuela International. She represented Monagas state.

Television

Telenovela

1992-2000
1992
Cara Sucia (Venevision, Venezuela)
1993
Amor De Papel (Venevision, Venezuela)
1994
Morena Clara (Venevision, Venezuela)
1995
Como Tu, Ninguna  (Venevision, Venezuela)
1997
Sol de Tentacion (Venevision, Venezuela)
Destino De Mujer (Venevision and TVE, Venezuela and Spain)
1998
La Chachala (TV Azteca, Mexico)
Tentaciones (TV Azteca, Mexico)
1999
Cuando Hay Pasion (Venevision, Venezuela)

2000-present
2000
Hechizo de Amor (Venevision, Venezuela)
Angelica Pecado (RCTV, Venezuela)
2002
La Mujer de Judas (RCTV and RCTV Intl, Venezuela)
Mi Gorda Bella (RCTV and RCTV Intl, Venezuela)
2005
Amor A Palos

References

External links
Miss Venezuela Official Website
Miss International Official Website

Living people
Miss Venezuela International winners
Venezuelan telenovela actresses
Miss International 1991 delegates
Venezuelan female models
Actresses from Caracas
Year of birth missing (living people)